Olivet Chapel, since 1965 known as the A.U.M.P. affiliated St. John's African Union Methodist Protestant Church, is a historic Presbyterian African American mission chapel located at Goshen in Orange County, New York.  It was built about 1910 and is a load-bearing masonry building with a bluestone foundation and topped by a high hipped roof.  Horace Pippin (1888–1946) was a noted member of the church prior to its moving to Olivet Chapel.

It was listed on the National Register of Historic Places in 2010.

References

 

African-American history of New York (state)
Properties of religious function on the National Register of Historic Places in New York (state)
Churches completed in 1910
20th-century Methodist church buildings in the United States
Churches in Orange County, New York
National Register of Historic Places in Orange County, New York
A.U.M.P. Church